Desmia ceresalis is a moth in the family Crambidae. It was described by Francis Walker in 1859. It is found in Jamaica, Cuba and Puerto Rico.

References

Moths described in 1859
Desmia
Moths of the Caribbean